Louis Laguerre (1663 – 20 April 1721) was a French decorative painter mainly working in England.

Born in Versailles in 1663 and trained at the Paris Academy under Charles Le Brun, he came to England in 1683, where he first worked with Antonio Verrio, and then on his own. He rivalled with Sir James Thornhill in the field of history painting, primarily decorating the great houses of the nobility. His wall paintings can be found in Blenheim Palace, Marlborough House, Petworth House, Burghley House, Fetcham Park House and Chatsworth House. In the 1980s, a restoration project revealed work by Laguerre at Frogmore House also. His subject matter included English victories over the armies of Louis XIV; at Hampton Court Palace he carried out work for William III of England, for whom he depicted the Labours of Hercules.

Laguerre painted religious subjects at St Lawrence's Church, Whitchurch, London.  In 1731 Alexander Pope wrote, 
On painted ceilings you devoutly stare
Where sprawl the saints of Verrio or Laguerre...
which was taken by some contemporaries to be a reference to Laguerre's work for James Brydges, 1st Duke of Chandos at this church and the nearby Cannons House.
 
Laguerre was also a director of Godfrey Kneller's London Academy of Drawing and Painting, founded in the autumn of 1711. He died in London on 20 April 1721. His father-in-law was Jean Tijou.

Gallery of Laugerre's Work

See also 
 English school of painting

References

Further reading 
 
 
 
 
 
 

1663 births
1721 deaths
17th-century French painters
French male painters
18th-century French painters
People from Versailles
French emigrants to the Kingdom of England
French history painters
18th-century French male artists